Aphrosylus aguellinus is a species of fly in the family Dolichopodidae.

Distribution
Algeria.

References

Hydrophorinae
Insects described in 1955
Diptera of Africa